Dancing in a Harem was an 1897 French short silent film by Georges Méliès. It was sold by Méliès's Star Film Company and is numbered 132 in its catalogues.

The Méliès scholar John Frazer was unable to obtain a print, but speculated in 1979 that a fragment may survive in Budapest. The Internet Movie Database lists an 1989 Hungarian TV miniseries on film history, Fejezetek a film történetéböl, that purportedly includes a clip from the film. Jacques Malthête's 2008 Méliès filmography lists the film as presumed lost.

References

External links
 

1890s French films
French black-and-white films
Films directed by Georges Méliès
French silent short films
Lost French films
1890s dance films
1890s lost films
1897 short films